Alathur Srinivasa Iyer (1911–1980), born in Tamil Nadu, was an Indian vocalist. Together with Alathur Sivasubramania Iyer, he formed the successful duo known as the Alathur Brothers (though the two were not in fact brothers). He was awarded the Madras Music Academy's Sangeetha Kalanidhi in 1965. A student of Alathur Venkatesa Iyer, Srinivasa gave his first performances when he was ten years old. From 1944 to 1968, he was a court musician for the Maharajah of Travancore. He lived longer than his partner, Alathur Sivasubramania Iyer, and performed many solo concerts after the death of Sivasubramania Iyer.

See also 

1911 births
1980 deaths
Male Carnatic singers
Carnatic singers
20th-century Indian male singers
20th-century Indian singers
Singers from Tamil Nadu
Recipients of the Sangeet Natak Akademi Award